The 1993 NCAA Division I Men's Golf Championships were contested at the 54th annual NCAA-sanctioned golf tournament for determining the individual and team national champions of men's collegiate golf at the Division I level in the United States.

The tournament was held at the Champions Golf Course in Lexington, Kentucky.

Florida won the team championship, the Gators' third NCAA title and first since 1973. Florida bested second-placed Georgia Tech by a single stroke (1,145–1,146).

Future professional Todd Demsey, from Arizona State, won the individual title, the fourth win in five championships for a Sun Devil golfer.

Individual results

Individual champion
 Todd Demsey, Arizona State (278)

Team results

Finalists

Eliminated after 36 holes

DC = Defending champions
Debut appearance

References

NCAA Men's Golf Championship
Golf in Kentucky
NCAA Golf Championship
NCAA Golf Championship
NCAA Golf Championship